Bwlch-y-Cibau also known as the "pass of the husks" in English, is a small village located between Llanfyllin and Welshpool. It is situated on the A490. It is in the community of Meifod.

Amenities
The village is very rural with only a public house, a church and a former school house.

Transport
The village also was served by the Llanfyllin Branch railway line which was situated on the B493 near Llanfechain. The stop was little more than a halt which was over a mile north of the village. It closed in 1965 along with the line. The nearest railway station is now Welshpool. The village is also served by the bus no. 76 which connects the village to Llanfyllin and Welshpool although only runs five services both ways a day from Monday to Saturday including one additional to serve the nearby Llanfyllin High School.

References

Villages in Powys